Iwate can refer to:

 Iwate Prefecture, a prefecture of Japan.
 Iwate, Iwate, a town in Iwate Prefecture, Japan.
 Japanese cruiser Iwate, an armored cruiser of the Imperial Japanese Navy from 1900 to the end of World War II.